Basic Education High School No. 5 Botataung (abbreviated အ.ထ.က (၅) ဗိုလ်တထောင်; commonly known as Botataung 5 High School) is a public high school in Myanmar. Graduation rate averages above 85% of total candidates, every year. It offers classes from kindergarten to tenth standard, Grade-10.

Although the school is small with only four stories and no campus open-ground, it accommodates around 3,000 students including the 300 student intake each year. The school is co-educational.

It is located in Botataung Township, the eastern side of Yangon, at the junction of 45th Street (Upper) and Anawrahta Road. The full address is No. 168, Anawratha Road, Yangon. It is surrounded by food shops, Paragu Hospital, Police Station and City Mart Shopping Center. Transportation is convenient because of the two bus-stops, one at 46th Street and another one on Thein Phyu Road.

Administration
The school is administered by the Ministry of Education.

Uniform
Like all public schools in Myanmar, Botataung students wear school uniform. There are two sets of uniform, one for wear from Kindergarten to 4th Standard (Year 1 to 5), and another, more traditional one, for wear from the 5th Standard to 10th Standard (Year 6 to 11). All uniforms are of the same colour - a white shirt or blouse, with a green garment for the bottom.

Boys uniform
From Kindergarten (Year 1) to the 4th Standard (Year 5), male students wear a white shirt (with or without the collar), tucked into a green pants - either short or long.
From Year 6 onwards, the students wear a white shirt (with or without the collar), and a green longyi/Paso.

Girls uniform
 From Kindergarten (Year 1) to the 4th Standard (Year 5), girls wear either skirts or pants, with a white shirt. Girls usually wear slippers.
 From Year 6 onwards, the uniform becomes more traditional, like its male counterpart. The girl must wear either a front opening (yin-zee) or side opening (yin-phone) traditional Burmese blouse, with the longyi/Htamein as the lower garment.

Accomplishments
It ranks one of the highest overall in Myanmar High Schools in the Myanmar University Entrance exam, conducted by the Myanma Examination Board. The school is in the "nationwide outstanding top-ten students' list", colloquially known as the whole-Burma or top ten list. Every year, Botataung [5] students continue on to the Institute of Medicine 2.

Facilities

Multimedia classroom
Science lab
Computer classroom

External links
 https://web.archive.org/web/20101231005654/http://shs5.net/

High schools in Yangon